Fomyonkovo is a rural locality (a selo) in Krasnoyarskoye Rural Settlement, Zhirnovsky District, Volgograd Oblast, Russia. The population was 92 as of 2010. There are 5 streets.

Geography 
Fomyonkovo is located on the bank of the Medveditsa River, 46 km south of Zhirnovsk (the district's administrative centre) by road. Krasny Yar is the nearest rural locality.

References 

Rural localities in Zhirnovsky District